Scotchtown is a rural locality and town in the local government area of Circular Head in the North West region of Tasmania.
The 2016 census determined a population of 254 for the state suburb of Scotchtown.

History
The locality was gazetted in 1973. As of May 2001, it is an officially named unbounded locality.

Geography
The Duck River flows through from south to north, and forms much of the western boundary.

Road infrastructure
The C218 route (Trowutta Road / Reids Road / Tayatea Road) enters from the north-west and runs south and east before exiting. Route C223 (Maguires Road) starts at an intersection with route C218 and runs north-east before exiting.

References

Localities of Circular Head Council
Towns in Tasmania